Splendrillia stegeri is a species of sea snail, a marine gastropod mollusk in the family Drilliidae.

Description
The length of the shell varies between 4 mm and 6.5 mm.

Distribution
This marine species occurs off the Virgin Islands and Puerto Rico

References

 Nowell-Usticke, Gordon W. A Checklist of the Marine Shells of St. Croix, US Virgin Islands. Lane Press, 1959.

External links
 
 Fallon P.J. (2016). Taxonomic review of tropical western Atlantic shallow water Drilliidae (Mollusca: Gastropoda: Conoidea) including descriptions of 100 new species. Zootaxa. 4090(1): 1–363

stegeri
Gastropods described in 1959